Love Without End is a 1961 Hong Kong film directed by Doe Ching. It was remade in 1970.

Cast
 Lin Dai
 Kwan Shan
 Kao Pao Shu
 Cheung Kwong Chiu
 Yeung Chi Hing
 Lee Wan Chung
 Lok Kei
 Ho Fan
 Wong Chung
 Gam Gwan
 Chai Lam
 Liu Kei

See also
 Buliao qing (song)

External links
 IMDb entry
 HKMDB entry
 HK Cinemagic entry

1961 films
Shaw Brothers Studio films
1960s Mandarin-language films